Thomas Robbins, Tom Robbins or Thomas Robins may refer to:

 Thomas Robbins (minister) (1777–1856), American Congregational minister, bibliophile and antiquarian
 Thomas Robbins (sociologist) (1943–2015), independent American scholar of sociology of religion
 Thomas H. Robbins Jr. (1900–1972), American admiral
 Tom Alan Robbins, American actor
 Tom Robbins (born 1932), American author
 Tom Robbins, journalist with The Village Voice
 Thomas M. Robbins, US Army Major General; in Corps of Engineers World War II, see Manhattan Project
 Thomas Robins (actor), New Zealand actor
 Thomas Robins (inventor) (1868–1957), inventor of the conveyor belt
 Thomas Robins the Elder (1715/16–1770), English artist
 Thomas Robins the Younger (1748–1806), English artist
 Thomas Sewell Robins (1810–1880), British painter of maritime themes
 Ellis Robins, 1st Baron Robins (Thomas Ellis Robins, 1884–1962), American-born British businessman and public servant

See also
 Thomas Robinson (disambiguation)
 Thomas Robson (disambiguation)
 Tommy Robinson (disambiguation)
 Tommy Robison (born 1961), American football player
 Tommy Robson (1944-2020), English footballer